Kirill Alekseyevich Nikishin (born 5 February 2004) is a Russian footballer who plays as a forward for Lokomotiv Moscow.

Club career
Nikishin made his debut for Lokomotiv Moscow on 23 November 2022 in a Russian Cup game against FC Krasnodar.

Career statistics

References

External links
 
 

Living people
2004 births
Russian footballers
Association football forwards
Russia youth international footballers
FC Lokomotiv Moscow players